The Consulate-General of Pakistan, Dubai is a diplomatic mission of Pakistan in Dubai, United Arab Emirates. The consulate serves the emirate of Dubai and the five surrounding Northern Emirates of Sharjah, Ajman, Umm al-Quwain, Fujairah and Ras al-Khaimah. It is one of two Pakistani diplomatic missions in the UAE, the other being the Pakistani embassy in Abu Dhabi, to which it reports. The current Consul-General is Mr. Hassan Afzal Khan.

Consular services
The Pakistani community in Dubai numbers over 400,000, forming around 13% of the local population and constituting the third largest ethnicity in the city. The Consulate-General oversees Pakistani interests in Dubai and provides various services to Pakistani citizens in the emirate. It is the largest Pakistani consulate in the Middle East. It is located at Khalid bin Waleed Road in the Bur Dubai district. Consular services provided include the receiving, processing and delivery of documentation, including machine readable passports, manual passports, NADRA identity documents, attestation and visas. The consulate operates from Sunday to Thursday, with the operational hours ranging from early morning to afternoon. It remains closed on public holidays.

The consulate-general provides liaison with the various Pakistani associations in Dubai and the northern Emirates, including the Pakistan Association Dubai, Pakistan Association Ladies Wing (Dubai), Pakistan Professionals Wing, Pakistan Business Council (Dubai), and various Pakistani community centres. It also promotes trade, commerce and investment between Pakistan and Dubai. A Community Welfare Wing is attached with the consulate-general, which provides welfare services to Pakistanis residing in Dubai and the northern Emirates. These include general community welfare services, facilitating remittances, dispatching bodies of deceased persons, and settlement of issues relating to the Pakistani labour workforce working in Dubai and the northern Emirates.

Cultural events such as Pakistan's Independence Day are celebrated each year, during which the Consul-General of Pakistan in Dubai unfurls the national flag at the consulate in a ceremony.

Education
The consulate-general oversees the provision of all Pakistani-curriculum education in Dubai and the northern Emirates. There are currently 12 Pakistani international schools throughout Dubai and its adjacent emirates, four of which were established by the consulate-general and the remainder eight privately. The schools predominately provide education to the children of Pakistani expatriates, teaching from junior grades up to the higher secondary level. The curriculum is affiliated with the Federal Board of Intermediate and Secondary Education (FBISE) and the syllabus is English-medium. The schools are listed below:

 His Highness Shaikh Rashid Al Maktoum Pakistan School, Dubai
 Pakistan Islamiah Higher Secondary School, Sharjah
 Pakistan Higher Secondary School, Ras al-Khaimah
 Pakistan Islamiah Higher Secondary School, Fujairah
 Pakistan Education Academy, Dubai
 Al Farooq Pakistan School, Dubai
 Pakistan English School, Dubai
 Al Amaal Pakistan English, School, Sharjah
 Pakistan Islamiah Higher Secondary School, Ajman
 Omer Bin Khatab Pakistan School, Ajman

See also

 Pakistan–United Arab Emirates relations
 Embassy of Pakistan, Abu Dhabi
 List of diplomatic missions of Pakistan
 List of diplomatic missions in Dubai

References

External links
 Consulate-General of Pakistan, Dubai

Pakistan
Dubai
Pakistan–United Arab Emirates relations